The 2012–13 Alcorn State Braves basketball team represented Alcorn State University during the 2012–13 NCAA Division I men's basketball season. The Braves, led by head coach Luther Riley, played their home games at the Davey Whitney Complex and were members of the Southwestern Athletic Conference. They finished the season 10–24, 8–10 in SWAC play to finish in a three way tie for fifth place. They lost in the quarterfinals of the SWAC tournament to Prairie View A&M.

Roster

Schedule

|-
!colspan=9| Regular season

|-
!colspan=9| 2013 SWAC Basketball tournament

References

Alcorn State Braves basketball seasons
Alcorn State